Chaturbhuj Temple may refer to one of a number of  temples at various locations:

 Chaturbhuj Temple, Khajuraho, the temple at Khajuraho in Madhya Pradesh  
 Chaturbhuj Temple, Orchha, the temple located at Orchha in Madhya Pradesh
Chaturbhuj Temple, Gwalior, the temple at Gwalior Fort, Madhya Pradesh